Lascars is a 2009 French-language animated film starring Vincent Cassel, Diane Kruger and Omar Sy. It is a feature film adaptation of the French TV series Les Lascars. The film, which had a budget of €10 million, was co-produced by Canal Plus and France 2 and distributed by Bac Films. Cassel plays Tony, a petty crook whose friend Jose falls for Clemence (Kruger), a rich woman, and wants to quit the life of crime. The film has the alternative English title Round Da Way.

Cast
 Vincent Cassel: Tony Merguez
 IZM: José Frelate
 Diane Kruger: Clémence Santiépi
 Gilles Lellouche: Zoran
 Frédérique Bel: Manuella Lardu
 Hafid F. Benamar: Maurice "Momo" Gnignard
 Franck Sinius: Casimir
 Omar Sy: Narbé
 Fred Testot: Sammy
 François Levantal: Judge Santiépi
 Diam's: Jenny Frelate
 Vincent Desagnat: John Boolman
 Éric Judor: Chinese man, Airport security guard
 Katsuni: Brigitte

Reception
On French review aggregator AlloCiné, Lascars has an average rating of 3.9/5 from 21 reviews.

References

External links

2009 films
2009 animated films
2000s crime films
2000s French animated films
French crime films
German animated films
German crime films
2000s French-language films
Animated films based on animated series
2000s French films
2000s German films